Pholidoscelis taeniurus, the Hispaniolan blue-tailed ameiva or Haitian ameiva, is a member of the Teiidae family of lizards. It is endemic to the island of Hispaniola (Haiti and the Dominican Republic), including some satellite islands, like Île-à-Vache, Gonâve Island, and Isla Saona.

References

External links

taeniurus
Lizards of the Caribbean
Endemic fauna of Hispaniola
Reptiles of the Dominican Republic
Reptiles of Haiti
Reptiles described in 1862
Taxa named by Edward Drinker Cope